The football tournament at the 2017 Jeux de la Francophonie took place from 21 to 30 July in Abidjan, Ivory Coast. The organization of the football competition has been considered to be a fiasco by some participating countries. The tournament was supposed to follow the FIFA tiebreaker rules. However, the organizing committee decided to change the rules in the midst of the competition in favour of Ivory Coast, thus eliminating Guinea from the group stage. Due to these changes, D.R. Congo also qualified for the semifinals instead of Quebec. Also in the semifinals, Mali delegation protested the referee's call of a frivolous penalty that won the game for the hosts Ivory Coast.

Participants

 
 
 
 
 
 
  (withdrew)

Draw

The draw was carried out on 23 February 2017.

Prior to the draw, teams were divided in pools.

Squads

Players must be born on or after 1 January 1997.

Group stage

Tiebreakers
The ranking of each team in each group will be determined as follows:
 Greatest number of points obtained in group matches
 Greatest number of points obtained in direct confrontation 
 Goal difference in all group matches
 Greatest number of goals scored in all group matches

Group A

Group B

Group C

Group D

Knockout stage

Semi-finals

Third-place playoff

Final

Medalists

References

External links
 Results 

2017 Jeux de la Francophonie
International association football competitions hosted by Ivory Coast
2017 in African football
Football at the Jeux de la Francophonie